The Rough and Ready Cemetery is one of the older cemeteries in Drew County, Arkansas. It is located near the site of the village of Rough and Ready, which was one of the first settlements in Drew County and served as its first county seat, and is its only known surviving feature. The oldest known grave dates to 1847, although the oldest dated marker is marked 1860. A number of the county's early settlers are among the more than 200 graves in the cemetery.

The cemetery was listed on the National Register of Historic Places in 1999.

See also
 National Register of Historic Places listings in Drew County, Arkansas

References

External links
 

Cemeteries on the National Register of Historic Places in Arkansas
Buildings and structures completed in 1843
Buildings and structures in Drew County, Arkansas
Geography of Drew County, Arkansas
1843 establishments in Arkansas
National Register of Historic Places in Drew County, Arkansas
Cemeteries established in the 1840s